Lidtke Mill, also known as the Lime Springs Mill Complex, is a historic building located on the Upper Iowa River located in the "Old Town" area of Lime Springs, Iowa, United States. It is part of the  Lidtke Park.

The mill is an L-shaped structure is composed of limestone covered with a yellow brick veneer. The main section was completed in 1857 and rebuilt after a fire in 1894. At one time, it not only milled grains but also provided hydroelectric power to surrounding communities. The footprints of a worker nearly electrocuted there can still be seen in the floor of the control room. The miller's house is a frame structure that follows a rectangular plan. The original section of the building was built in 1857. Wings on the west and east sides were added around 1880. The cement block section on the north side was added in 1927. The mill complex is now open as a museum. From time to time, events such as the Buckwheat Festival are held at the site. The mill and the miller's house were listed together on the National Register of Historic Places in 1977.

References

External links
 Howard County: Lidtke Park - Lime Springs, IA
 Lidtke Mill - museum information at Iowa Beautiful

Houses on the National Register of Historic Places in Iowa
Industrial buildings and structures on the National Register of Historic Places in Iowa
Houses in Howard County, Iowa
Museums in Howard County, Iowa
Mill museums in the United States
National Register of Historic Places in Howard County, Iowa